Swapna Sanchari is a 2011 Indian Malayalam-language comedy drama film directed by Kamal, starring Jayaram and Samvrutha Sunil in the lead roles. It was a success at the box office. Innocent won the Asianet Film Award for Best Supporting Actor for this film.

Plot

Swapna Sanchari revolves around the gulf-returned Ajaychandran Nair. He has a lovely wife Reshmi and a 9th standard daughter Ashwathy who does not speak more. His father believes in old ways. The movie tracks his ups in life in the first half, where he returns from Gulf with a huge pocket. He dreams of earning a big name in the society, thus buys a Mercedes-Benz, an old theatre, land in front of panchayat hall, promised hefty contributions for community hall and several other charitable organizations where he can put his name in front. He undertakes running the village festival completely by himself to earn a big name. Thus he dreams big but falls short in no time after his business in Dubai falls down. In no time Ajaychandran reduces nothing to big zero. The movie sketches the plot of those who falls into debt due to show-off.

Cast

Production
Director Kamal and actor Jayaram joined together in Swapna Sanchari, after a gap of 12 years. This was also the second production of Trueline Cinema's Thankachan Emmanuel his debut picture was

Soundtrack

Box office
The film collected $2,188 from UK box office. The film was declared as a commercial success at the Kerala box office.

References

External links
 Metromatinee article

2010s Malayalam-language films
Films scored by M. Jayachandran
2011 comedy-drama films
2011 films
Indian comedy-drama films
Indian family films
Films shot in Munnar
Films directed by Kamal (director)